Homeobox protein DLX-1 is a protein that in humans is encoded by the DLX1 gene.

Function 
This gene encodes a member of a homeobox transcription factor gene family similar to the Drosophila distal-less gene. The encoded protein is localized to the nucleus where it may function as a transcriptional regulator of signals from multiple TGF-β superfamily members. The encoded protein may play a role in the control of craniofacial patterning and the differentiation and survival of inhibitory neurons in the forebrain. This gene is located in a tail-to-tail configuration with another member of the family on the long arm of chromosome 2. Alternatively spliced transcript variants encoding different isoforms have been described.

References

Further reading